Josh Shipp, (born January 20, 1982) is an American motivational speaker for teachers, best-selling author, and TV personality. He is most known for his TEDx talk entitled "Every Kid is One Caring Adult Away from Being a Success Story" and his television programs including Teen Trouble which aired on Lifetime and A&E executive produced by Ellen Rakieten of The Oprah Winfrey Show.

Josh was president of Oklahoma DECA in high school and began speaking professionally at the age of 17. He has since spoken at large events such as the National FFA convention and the SADD National Convention. Josh has been a spokesperson for National Foster Care Month, wrote a teen advice column for Cosmogirl!, and appeared as a teen advice correspondent on MTV‘s Total Request Live.

His recent work focuses on the impact parents, teachers, and caring adults have in the life of a child.

Television shows

Other television appearances 
Josh has also appeared as a guest on Good Morning America, Take Part Live, The Steve Harvey Show, Anderson Cooper Live, The Jeff Probst Show, and others to discuss issues related to teens, parents, and teachers.

Books
 The Teen's Guide to World Domination: Advice on Life, Liberty, and the Pursuit of Awesomeness, St. Martins Press 
 Jump Ship: Ditch Your Dead-End Job and Turn Your Passion into a Profession, St. Martins Press 
 The Grown-Up's Guide to Teenage Humans: How to Decode Their Behavior, Develop Unshakable Trust, and Raise a Respectable Adult, Harper Wave 
 No Matter What: A Foster Care Tale, Familius

References

External links
 
 

1982 births
Living people
American motivational writers
American motivational speakers
American Internet celebrities
American self-help writers
21st-century American non-fiction writers
People from Yukon, Oklahoma
People from Los Gatos, California